Artur Leonidovich Minchuk (born 7 July 1989) is a Russian pair skating coach and former competitor.

Career

Competitive 
Minchuk's partnership with Ksenia Stolbova lasted three seasons, from 2006–07 to 2008–09. They finished 11th competing on the senior level at the Russian Championships in December 2008.

Minchuk teamed up with Anna Silaeva in 2009. They took the bronze medal at the 2010 Russian Junior Championships and were named in Russia's team to the 2010 World Junior Championships in The Hague, Netherlands. The pair finished 11th after placing 9th in the short program and 14th in the free skate. The following season, they qualified for the 2010–11 Junior Grand Prix Final in Beijing, where they finished 8th.

Post-competitive 
Minchuk joined the Russian Ice Stars in 2011. He works as a skating coach in Saint Petersburg, Russia. His students include:

 Aleksandra Boikova / Dmitrii Kozlovskii (from 2015), 2021 World bronze medalists, 2020 European champions
 Anastasia Mishina / Aleksandr Galliamov (from 2020), 2021 World champions

Programs 
(with Silaeva)

Competitive highlights 
JGP: Junior Grand Prix

With Silaeva

With Stolbova

References

External links 

 

Russian male pair skaters
Russian figure skating coaches
1989 births
Living people
Sportspeople from Kyiv
Ukrainian emigrants to Russia